All official holidays in Estonia are established by acts of Parliament.

Public holidays
The following are holidays that mean days off:

National holidays
The following holidays do not give a day off:

References 
 Public and National Holidays Act 
 Estonian Holidays in 2014
 List of holidays celebrated in the European Union in 2006 was used for translation:
 in Estonian
 in English

 
Estonia
Society of Estonia
Holidays